In Germanic paganism, Nerthus is a goddess associated with a ceremonial wagon procession. Nerthus is attested by first century AD Roman historian Tacitus in his ethnographic work Germania.

In Germania, Tacitus records that a group of Germanic peoples were particularly distinguished by their veneration of the goddess. Tacitus describes the wagon procession in some detail: Nerthus's cart is found on an unspecified island in the "ocean", where it is kept in a sacred grove and draped in white cloth. Only a priest may touch it. When the priest detects Nerthus's presence by the cart, the cart is drawn by heifers. Nerthus's cart is met with celebration and peacetime everywhere it goes, and during her procession no one goes to war and all iron objects are locked away. In time, after the goddess has had her fill of human company, the priest returns the cart to her "temple" and slaves ritually wash the goddess, her cart, and the cloth in a "secluded lake". According to Tacitus, the slaves are then immediately drowned in the lake.

Scholars have linked Tacitus's description of ceremonial wagons found from around Tacitus's time up until the Viking Age, particularly the Germanic Iron Age Dejbjerg wagon in Denmark and the Viking Age Oseberg ship burial wagon in Norway. The goddess name Nerthus (from Proto-Germanic *Nerþuz) is the early Germanic etymological precursor to the Old Norse deity name Njörðr, a male deity who is comparably associated with wagons and water in Norse mythology. Together with his children Freyja and Freyr, the three form the Vanir, a family of gods. The Old Norse record contains three narratives featuring ritual wagon processions that scholars have compared to Tacitus's description of Nerthus's wagon procession, one of which (and potentially all of them) focus on Njörðr's son Freyr.

Additionally, scholars have sought to explain the difference in sex between the early Germanic and Old Norse forms of the deity, discussed potential etymological connections to the obscure female deity name Njörun, mention of the mysterious Sister-wife of Njörðr, proposed a variety of locations for where the procession may have occurred (generally in Denmark), and considered Tacitus's sources for his description.

Tacitus's Nerthus has had some influence on popular culture, and in particular the now widely rejected manuscript reading of Hertha in Germany.

Etymology

Scholars commonly identify the goddess Nerthus with Njörðr, a deity who is attested in Old Norse texts and in numerous Scandinavian place names. Scholars identify the Romano-Germanic Nerthus as the linguistic precursor to the Old Norse deity name Njörðr and have reconstructed the form as Proto-Germanic *Nerþuz. As outlined by philologist John McKinnell, "Nerthus > *Njarðuz (breaking) > *Njǫrðuz > Njǫrðr". Scholars have additionally linked both Nerthus and Njörðr to the obscure Old Norse goddess name Njörun.

The meaning of the theonym is unclear, but seems to be cognate with Old Irish nert, meaning 'strength', perhaps meaning 'the powerful one'. The name may be related to Old English geneorð, meaning 'contented', and the Old English place name Neorxnawang, used to gloss the word 'paradise' in Old English texts, or the word north. According to philologist Jaan Puhvel, "*Nerthuz is etymologically ambivalent, cognate not only with Old Irish nert 'strength' and Greek andro- but with Vedic sū-nrt́ā 'good vigor, vitality' (used especially for Uṣás, thus gender ambivalent)". According to McKinnell, "The meaning of the name has usually been connected with Old Irish nert ‘strength’ (so ‘the powerful one’), but it might be related to Old English geneorð ‘contented’ and neorxnawang ‘paradise’ (literally ‘field of contentment’), or to the word ‘north’ (i.e. ‘deity of the northern people’, cf. Greek νέρτερος ‘belonging to the underworld’)."

Germania
In chapter 40 of his ethnography Germania, Roman historian Tacitus, discussing the Suebian tribes of Germania, writes that beside the populous Semnones and warlike Langobardi there are seven more remote Suebian tribes; the Reudigni, Aviones, Anglii, Varini, Eudoses, Suarines, and Nuitones. The seven tribes are surrounded by rivers and forests and, according to Tacitus, there is nothing particularly worthy of comment about them as individuals, yet they are particularly distinguished as a group in that they all worship the goddess Nerthus. The chapter reads as follows:

Tacitus's sources
Tacitus does not provide information regarding his sources for his description of Nerthus (nor the rest of Germania). Tacitus's account may stem from earlier but now lost literary works (such as perhaps Pliny the Elder's lost Bella Germaniae), potentially his own experiences in Germania, or merchants and soldiers, such as Germanic peoples in Rome or Germania and Romans who spent time in the region.

Tacitus's Germania places particular emphasis on the Semnones, and scholars have suggested that some or all of Tacitus's information may come from king Masyas of the Semnones and/or his high priestess, the seeress Ganna. The two visited Rome for a blessing from Roman emperor Domitian in 92 AD. While Tacitus appears to have been away from Rome during this period, he would have had plenty of opportunity to gain information provided by king Masyas and/or Ganna from those who spent time with the two during their visit.

Reception
Tacitus's description of the Nerthus procession has been the subject of extensive discussion from scholars.

Name and manuscript variations
All surviving manuscripts of Tacitus's Germania date from around the fifteenth century and these display significant variation in the name of the goddess: All attested forms are in accusative case and include Nertum (yielding the nominate form Nerthus), Herthum (implying a nominative form of Hertha) and several others (including Nechtum, Neithum, Neherthum, and Verthum).

Of the various forms found in the extant Germania manuscript tradition, two have yielded significant discussion among scholars since at least the 19th century, Nerthus and Hertha. Hertha was popular in some of the earliest layers of Germania scholarship, such as the edition of Beatus Rhenanus. These scholars linked the name with a common German word for Earth (compare modern German Erde). This reading has subsequently been rejected by most scholars. Since pioneering 19th century philologist Jacob Grimm's identification of the form Nerthus as the etymological precursor to the Old Norse deity name Njǫrðr, the reading Nerthus has been widely accepted as correct in scholarship.

In 1902, the Codex Aesinas (often abbreviated as E) was discovered, and it was also found to contain the form Nertum, yielding the reading Nerthus. The Codex Aesinas is a 15th-century composite manuscript that is considered a direct copy of the Codex Hersfeldensis, the oldest identifiable manuscript of the text. All other manuscripts of Tacitus's Germania are thought by scholars to stem from the Codex Aesinas.

Some scholars have continued suggesting alternate readings to Nerthus. For example, in 1992, Lotte Motz proposes that the linguistic correspondence is a coincidence and that "The variant nertum was chosen by Grimm because it corresponds to Njǫrðr". Instead, Motz propose that various female entities from the continental Germanic folklore record, particularly those in central Germany and the Alps, stem from a single source, who she identifies as Nerthus, and that migrating Germanic peoples brought the goddess to those regions from coastal Scandinavia. After her death, Motz's proposal received support from Rudolf Simek. John Lindow rejects Motz's proposal and Simek's support. He highlights the presence of the form in the Codex Aesinas (discovered in 1902, while Grimm died in 1863), and asks, "would it not be an extraordinary coincidence that a deity who fits the pattern of the later fertility gods should have a name that is etymologically identical with one of them?"

Location
Scholars have proposed a variety of locations for Tacitus's account of Nerthus. For example, Anders Andrén says:

In the accounts of specific Germanic tribes, Tacitus also writes about the divine twins, the Alcis, among the Naharvali, and about the goddess Nerthus among a group of tribes, probably located in the southern part of present-day Denmark.

Some scholars have proposed that the location of the Nerthus procession occurred on Zealand in Denmark. They link the Nerthus with the medieval place name Niartharum (modern Nærum) located on Zealand. Further justification is given in that Lejre, the seat of the ancient kings of Denmark, is also located on Zealand. Nerthus is then commonly compared to the goddess Gefjon, who is said to have plowed the island of Zealand from Sweden in the Prose Edda book Gylfaginning and in Lejre wed the legendary Danish king Skjöldr.

Chambers notes that the mistaken name Hertha (see Name and manuscript variations above) led to the hydronym Herthasee, a lake on the German island of Rügen, which antiquarians proposed as a potential location of the Nerthus site described in Tacitus. However, along with the rejection of the reading Hertha, the location is no longer considered to be a potential site.

Difference in sex between Nerthus and Njörðr
Although Njörðr etymologically descends from *Nerþuz, Tacitus describes Nerthus female while the Old Norse deity Njörðr is male. The form *Nerþuz does indicate whether the deity was considered male or female. This difference in sex between the two has resulted in significant discussion from scholars. A variety of reasons for this difference have been proposed: Over the years, scholars have variously proposed that that Nerthus was likely one of a pair of deities in a manner similar to Njörðr's incestuous children Freyr and Freyja (perhaps involving hieros gamos), that Nerthus was a hermaphroditic deity, that the deity's sex simply changed from female to male over time, or that Tacitus's account mistakes Nerthus for a female deity rather than male deity. Others have proposed that a 'female Njörðr' continues into the Old Norse corpus as the Sister-wife of Njörðr and/or in the goddess name Njörun.

Wagons, wagon processions, the Vanir, and cyclical rituals
Scholars associate Tacitus's description of Nerthus's vehiculum (translated above by Birley as "chariot" and by Mattingly as "cart") ritually deposited in a lacus (translated by Birley and Mattingly above as "lake") with ceremonial wagons found ritually placed in peat bogs around Tacitus's time, ceremonial wagons from the Viking Age, and descriptions of ceremonial wagon processions in Old Norse texts. Notable examples include the Dejbjerg wagon—in fact a composite of two wagons—discovered in western Jutland, Denmark. A wagon from the Viking Age was found in the Oseberg ship burial in Norway. This wagon may have been incapable of turning corners and may been solely used for ritual purposes. The ship burial contains tapestry fragments, today known as the Oseberg tapestry fragments. These fragments depict a wagon procession.

In Norse mythology, Njörðr is strongly associated with water, and he and his children, Freyr and Freyja, are particularly associated with wagons. Together this family is known in Old Norse sources as the Vanir. Njörðr is referred to as "god of wagons" (Old Norse vagna guð) in the principal manuscript of Skáldskaparmál (the Codex Regius). According to the Prose Edda, Freyja drives a chariot driven by cats, which scholars have linked to the depiction of nine cats on the Oseberg ship burial wagon, potentially indicating a wagon procession featuring the goddess. Dated to the 14th century, Ögmundar þáttr dytts tells of a ritual wagon procession wherein a depiction of Freyr is driven around in a wagon by a priestess in a manner scholars have compared to Tacitus's description.

Similar wagon procession-narratives may be found in two other texts, namely a description of a god name Lýtir in Flateyjarbók and one featuring Frotho in Gesta Danorum, who is driven around for three days after his death so that the country wouldn't crumble. Both of these names have been interpreted by scholars as likely bynames for Freyr.

Some scholars have interpreted this to reflect that this procession occurred as a cyclic ritual associated with the Vanir. According to Jens Peter Schjødt, "if we accept a close relationship among, perhaps even an identity of, Nerthus, Freyr, and Frotho ... it appears that these three descriptions are all part of a discourse connecting gods of the vanir type with circumambulations and thus with processions focusing on yearly rituals." Schjødt further says:
Cyclical rituals have no doubt taken place during several millennia in the North as well as everywhere else. One of the most famous descriptions of such a ritual from the Early Iron Age is Tacitus's description of the Nerthus ritual in Germania ch. 40. Although it is not said explicitly that this is a cyclical ritual, there is no doubt that it is recurring and that it involves the whole community. Like with most other rituals of this type, we are not told at what time of the year the Nerthus procession took place, but since it is clearly a ritual connected with fertility and peace, we may conjecture that it was not during the summer, which was the season for war and other kinds of male activities.

Hilda Davidson draws a parallel between these incidents and Tacitus's account of Nerthus, suggesting that in addition a neck-ring-wearing female figure "kneeling as if to drive a chariot" also dates from the Bronze Age. Davidson says that the evidence suggests that similar customs as detailed in Tacitus's account continued to exist during the close of the pagan period through worship of the Vanir.

Bog bodies

Known as bog bodies, numerous well-preserved human remains have been found in peat bogs in Northern Europe. Like the wagons interred in peat bogs discussed above, these bodies were intentionally and ritually placed. Various scholars have linked Tacitus's description of drowned slaves in a "lake" as a reference to the interment of human corpses in peat bogs. For example, according to archaeologist Peter Vilhelm Glob:
The description of the goddess' attendants in the lake on the completion of the rites recalls the sacrificed bog people. There is indeed much to suggest that the bog people were participants in ritual celebrations of this kind, which culminated in their death and deposition in the bogs.

"Mother Earth" and the Roman cult of Cybele

In his description of Nerthus, Tacitus refers to the goddess as "Mother Earth" (Terra Mater). This has been received by scholars in a variety of ways and impacted early manuscript readings of the deity's name (especially Herthum, see "Name and manuscript variations" section above). In his assessment of the Old Norse personification of earth (Jörð, a goddess in Norse mythology), McKinnell says that the Old Norse earth personification does not appear to be notably connected to the Vanir, Njörðr, and/or Nerthus. He concludes that "it seems likely that Tacitus equates Nerthus with Terra Mater as an interpretatio Romana, a translation into terms his Roman readers would find familiar." John Lindow says that Tacitus's "identification with Mother Earth probably has much less to do with Jörd in Scandinavian mythology than with fertility goddesses in many cultures".

The Phyrgian goddess Cybele had been absorbed into the Roman pantheon by Tacitus's time, and Tacitus himself served as a priest in the cult of Cybele, which included duties such as washing a sacred cult stone. Similar to Tacitus's description of Nerthus, Cybele was at times closely connected to or conflated with the concept of Terra Mater ('Mother Earth') through her identity as Mater Deum ('Mother of the Gods'), and was at times depicted with a chariot pulled by lions.

Modern influence
The minor planet 601 Nerthus is named after Nerthus. The form "Hertha" was adopted by several German football clubs.

Up until its superseding as the dominant reading, Hertha had some influence in German popular culture. For example, Hertha and Herthasee (see "location" section above) play major roles in German novelist Theodor Fontane's 1896 novel Effi Briest.

Nerþuz is a character that appears in Fire Emblem Heroes.

See also
 Auðumbla, a primeval cow in the mythology of the North Germanic peoples
 Baduhenna, a Germanic goddess mentioned by Tacitus in his Annals
 "Isis" of the Suebi, another apparently Germanic goddess mentioned by Tacitus in his Germania
 Nereus, a deity and son of the sea and earth in Greek mythology
 Tamfana, another Germanic goddess mentioned by Tacitus in his Annals

Notes

References

 Andrén, Anders. 2020. "The Spatial and Temporal Frame" in Jens Peter Schjødt, John Lindow, and Anders Andrén, ed. The Pre-Christian Religions of the North. History and Structures, Volume I: Basic Premises and Consideration of Sources, pp. 135–160. Brepols.
 Bintley, Michael D. J. 2015. Trees in the Religions of Early Medieval England. Boydell Press. 
 Birley, A. R. Trans. 1999. Agricola and Germany. Oxford University Press. 
 Chambers, Raymond Wilson. 2001 [1912]. Widsith: A Study in Old English Heroic Legend. Cambridge University Press. 
 de Vries, Jan. 1977. Altnordisches Etymologisches Worterbuch. Brill.
 Finnur Jónsson. 1931. Lexicon poeticum. S. L. Møllers bogtrykkeri.
 Glob, P. V. 2004 [1965]. The Bog People: Iron Age Man Preserved. New York Review Books.  
 Gunnell, Terry. 1995. The Origins of Drama in Scandinavia. D.S. Brewer. 
 Chadwick, Hector Munro. 1907. The Origin of the English Nation. 
 Davidson, Hilda Ellis. 1988. Myths and Symbols in Pagan Europe: early Scandinavian and Celtic religions. Manchester University Press.
 Hardy, Barbara. 2010. "Tellers and Listeners in Effi Briest" in Theodor Fontane and the European Context: Literature, Culture and Society in Prussia and Europe: Proceedings of the Interdisciplinary Symposium at the Institute of Germanic Studies, University of London in March 1999. Rodopi. 
 Hopkins, Joseph. 2012. "Goddesses Unknown I: Njǫrun and the Sister-Wife of Njǫrðr". RMN Newsletter; volume 5. pp. 39–44.
 Ingunn Ásdísardóttir. 2020. "Freyja" in "Written Sources" in Jens Peter Schjødt, John Lindow, and Anders Andrén, ed. The Pre-Christian Religions of the North. History and Structures, Volume III: Social, Geographical, and Historic Contexts, and Communication between Worlds, pp. 1273–1302. Brepols.
 Lindow, John. 2020a. "Written Sources" in Jens Peter Schjødt, John Lindow, and Anders Andrén, ed. The Pre-Christian Religions of the North. History and Structures, Volume I: Basic Premises and Consideration of Sources, pp. 63–101. Brepols.
 Lindow, John. 2020b. "Njǫrðr" in Jens Peter Schjødt, John Lindow, and Anders Andrén, ed. The Pre-Christian Religions of the North. History and Structures, Volume III: Social, Geographical, and Historic Contexts, and Communication between Worlds, pp. 1331–1344. Brepols.
 Lindow, John. 2020c. Old Norse Mythology. Oxford University Press.
 Lindow, John. 2001. Norse Mythology: A Guide to the Gods, Heroes, Rituals, and Beliefs. Oxford University Press. 
 Mattingly, Harold. 2009. Agricola and Germania. Penguin.  
 McKinnell, John. 2005. Meeting the Other in Norse Myth and Legend. D. S. Brewer. 
 McKinnell, John. 2022. "The Earth as Body in Old Norse". Religionsvidenskabeligt Tidsskrift 74: 534–550. Viewable online.
 Motz, Lotte. 1992. "The Goddess Nerthus: A New Approach". Amsterdamer Beiträge zur älteren Germanistik 36:1-19.
 North, Richard. 1997. Heathen Gods in Old English Literature. Cambridge University Press. 
 Janson, Henrik. 2018. "Pictured by the Other: Classical and Early Medieval Perspectives on Religions in the North" in John McKinnell, John Lindow, and Margaret Clunies Ross, ed. The Pre-Christian Religions of the North, pp. 7–40. Brepols.
 Puhvel, Jaan. 1989. Comparative Mythology. Johns Hopkins University Press. 
 Sanders, Karin. 2009. Bodies in the Bog and the Archaeological Imagination. The University of Chicago Press. 
 Schjødt, Jens Peter. 2020a. "Various Ways of Communicating" in Jens Peter Schjødt, John Lindow, and Anders Andrén, ed. The Pre-Christian Religions of the North. History and Structures, Volume III: Social, Geographical, and Historic Contexts, and Communication between Worlds, pp. 589–642. Brepols.
 Schjødt, Jens Peter. 2020b. "Cyclical Rituals" in Jens Peter Schjødt, John Lindow, and Anders Andrén, ed. The Pre-Christian Religions of the North. History and Structures, Volume III: Social, Geographical, and Historic Contexts, and Communication between Worlds, pp. 797–822. Brepols.
 Simek, Rudolf. 2007. translated by Angela Hall. Dictionary of Northern Mythology. D.S. Brewer 
 Stuart, Duane Reed. 1916. Tacitus - Germania. The Macmillan Company.
 Sturtevant, Albert Morey (1952). "Regarding the Old Norse name Gefjon" as published in Scandinavian Studies; volume 24 (number 4, November). ISSN 0036-5637
 Toswell, M. J. 2010. "Quid Tacitus...? The Germania and the Study of Anglo-Saxon England". Florilegium 27 (2010): 27–62.
 Turville-Petre, Gabriel. 1964. Myth and Religion of the North: The Religion of Ancient Scandinavia. Weidenfeld and Nicolson.

Further reading
 Polomé, E. "A Propos De La Déesse Nerthus." Latomus 13, no. 2 (1954): 167–200. www.jstor.org/stable/41517674.
 Dumézil, Georges. "Njordr, Nerthus et le folklore scandinave des génies de la mer". In: Revue de l'histoire des religions, tome 147, n°2, 1955. pp. 210–226. [DOI: https://doi.org/10.3406/rhr.1955.7224] ; www.persee.fr/doc/rhr_0035-1423_1955_num_147_2_7224

Fertility goddesses
Germanic goddesses
Harvest goddesses
Vanir